Iraklis Deskoulidis (born 1 October 1961) is a Greek wrestler. He competed at the 1984 Summer Olympics, the 1988 Summer Olympics and the 1992 Summer Olympics.

References

1961 births
Living people
Greek male sport wrestlers
Olympic wrestlers of Greece
Wrestlers at the 1984 Summer Olympics
Wrestlers at the 1988 Summer Olympics
Wrestlers at the 1992 Summer Olympics
Sportspeople from Athens
20th-century Greek people